Flaxy Martin is a 1949 film noir starring Zachary Scott and Virginia Mayo, and featuring Elisha Cook Jr., Dorothy Malone, and Douglas Kennedy. The  crime thriller was directed by Richard L. Bare based on a story written by David Lang.

The film tells of mob lawyer Walter Colby (Zachary Scott), whose involvement with a crime syndicate and a femme fatale (Mayo) get him in trouble.

Plot
A murder occurs, and a witness tells the police that she will never forget the killer’s face.  Mob attorney Walter Colby (Scott) is called by crime boss Hap Richie (Douglas Kennedy) in the middle of the night to arrange bail for his hood Caesar (Jack Overman).  After doing  so Colby tells his girlfriend, showgirl Flaxy Martin (Virginia Mayo), that he wants to quit the organization and become respectable.  She pooh-poohs the idea, spiting him that he does not have enough money to do so, or afford her.

She would know, as she is two-timing him with Hap.

Meanwhile, Hap arranges through Flaxy for a perjurer, Peggy Farrar (Helen Westcott), to testify on behalf of Caesar, clearing him of the crime. Afterwords she seeks to blackmail Happ for $10,000 to maintain her silence.

Outraged at the double cross,  Flaxy loudly assails Peggy at her hotel apartment, drawing the attention of its desk clerk. Caesar silently shows up and kills her, leaving Flaxy later accused of the crime.

She goes to Colby for help, who comes up with a plan to clear her by confessing to be the murderer himself. With absolutely no evidence connecting him to the crime he is confident of his own acquittal. All goes well during the trial until an obvious perjurer takes the stand, again arranged by Hap, clearly with the acquiescence at the least of Flaxy. Colby is convicted on his testimony and sentenced to hard time.

Before he is transferred to prison, he is visited by Sam Malko (Tom D'Andrea), a former client who feels he owes Colby a good turn. Sam tells him that Cesar has been getting drunk and bragging how Colby was convicted instead of him.  Colby’s suspicions towards Flaxy begin to grow.

En route to the 20 years awaiting him, Colby slugs his guard and jumps off a train in the countryside. Injured, he passes out in front of motorist Nora Carson (Malone), who takes him home and nurses him.  She proves inexplicably attracted to him, in spite of his self centeredness and repeated lack of gratitude.  A statewide manhunt seeks his every trace, which he and Nora elude.

He returns to the city and seeks Sam‘s help, leaving Nora behind as he arranges a rendezvous with Cesar.  When he gets there he finds Cesar dead, and once again ends up at gunpoint with Caesar’s hood Roper. The two have a violent showdown on a rooftop, with Colby forcing his pursuer over the edge to his death.
 
He then heads for Flaxy’s apartment for a confrontation.  When Hap arrives she pulls a gun on both men, seeking to disappear with $40,000 of Hap’s money and leave the pair of rivals hanging.  Colby tells her she can’t shoot both men at once, and whomever she doesn’t will get her. Colby flicks off the lights and she shoots wildly at both, killing Hap. Colby calls the police, who come and arrest her.

Arriving back at Sam’s with the stolen $40,000 he insists he’s going to go on the lam alone. Nora wants to go with him. Sam councils reason. Colby gives into it, and calls the police to turn himself in.

Cast
 Virginia Mayo as Flaxy Martin
 Zachary Scott as Walter "Walt" Colby
 Dorothy Malone as Nora Carson
 Tom D'Andrea as Sam Malko
 Helen Westcott as Peggy Farrar
 Douglas Kennedy as Hap Richie
 Elisha Cook Jr. as Roper
 Douglas Fowley as Max, Detective
 Monte Blue as Joe, Detective
 Jack Overman as Caesar
 Max Wagner as Charles McMahon

Reception

Critic Hal Erickson lauded the film director, writing, "Director Richard L. Bare had only recently moved up from the "Joe McDoakes" comedy shorts to features when he guided Flaxy Martin with skill and aplomb."

References

External links
 
 
 
 
 

1949 films
1940s mystery drama films
American black-and-white films
American crime drama films
American mystery drama films
American chase films
Film noir
Films directed by Richard L. Bare
Films scored by William Lava
Warner Bros. films
1949 crime drama films
1940s English-language films
1940s American films